Pietro Orsini (died 1598) was a Roman Catholic prelate who served as Bishop of Aversa (1591–1598) and Bishop of Spoleto (1581–1591).

Biography
On 11 Apr 1580, Pietro Orsini was appointed during the papacy of Pope Gregory XIII as Coadjutor Bishop of Spoleto and Titular Bishop of Hippos. On 17 Apr 1580, he was consecrated bishop by Giulio Antonio Santorio, Cardinal-Priest of San Bartolomeo all'Isola, with Paolo Odescalchi, Bishop Emeritus of Penne e Atri, and Ludovico Taverna, Bishop of Lodi, serving as co-consecrators. On 16 May 1581, he succeeded Flavio Orsini as Bishop of Spoleto. On 5 Apr 1591, he was appointed during the papacy of Pope Gregory XIII as Bishop of Aversa, he succeeded Giorgio Manzolo as Bishop of Aversa. He served as Bishop of Aversa until his death in 1598.

References

External links and additional sources
  (for Chronology of Bishops)  
 (Chronology of Bishops) 
  (for Chronology of Bishops)  
 (Chronology of Bishops) 
 (for Chronology of Bishops) 
 (for Chronology of Bishops)  

16th-century Italian Roman Catholic bishops
Bishops appointed by Pope Gregory XIII
Bishops appointed by Pope Gregory XIV
1598 deaths
Bishops of Aversa